The Max and Emma Sue McRae House in McRae, Georgia is a Classical Revival-style house built in 1897 which is listed on the National Register of Historic Places.

It was built in anticipation of the wedding of Max McRae (d.1951) and Emma Sue Griffith (1875-1972).  The couple married in 1898 and moved into the home.

It is located at 405 S. Second Ave. in McRae in Telfair County, Georgia.  The listing included two other contributing buildings:  an early 1900s gardening shed and a 1930s garage.  It also included a non-contributing modern swimming pool.

Notes

References

Houses on the National Register of Historic Places in Georgia (U.S. state)
Neoclassical architecture in Georgia (U.S. state)
Houses completed in 1897
Telfair County, Georgia